Feather River College (FRC) is a community college in Quincy, California.  The school serves an annual full-time enrolled student body of approximately 1,500 students.

History 
Feather River College was established in 1968 to support the need for higher education in rural Plumas County. In April 1971 Feather River College moved from its temporary site at the Plumas County Fairgrounds in Quincy to its present location. Feather River College's petition to de-annex from the Peralta Community College District was granted in July 1988 and Feather River College became an independent, locally controlled community college district.

Setting

Campus
FRC is a  campus adjacent to Plumas National Forest land. There are student residence halls on campus. Facilities include an equine and rodeo arenas, pasture-land, and sports facilities. The surrounding wildlands are used by the college's Environmental Studies and Outdoor Recreation leadership programs. In January 2020, FRC became only the third college in America to be designated as a Firewise college, after efforts from students and faculty in the Environmental Studies and Outdoor Recreation Leadership departments.

Housing options
Student apartments are available on campus, a short walk from the main campus. The residence halls and apartments are managed on-site and include residence assistance, security, and student activities.

Academics 
Feather River College offers the Associate in Arts degree, Associate in Science degree, and certificates, as well as a Bachelor of Science degree in equine and ranch management.

Phi Theta Kappa Honor Society 
The Feather River College Phi Theta Kappa chapter was founded in 1993.

Demographics 

Student Population (total head-count for Fall 2015, including on and off-campus students served): 1,705
 Male: 761; 44.63%
 Female: 942; 55.25%
 Unknown: 2; .12%

Ethnicities 
 African-American: 217; 12.73%
 American Indian/Alaskan Native: 36; 2.11%
 Asian: 46; 2.70%
 Filipino: 15; 0.88%
 Hispanic: 353: 20.70%
 Multi-Ethnicity: 5; 0.29%
 Pacific Islander: 19; 1.11%
 Unknown: 68; 3.99%
 White Non-Hispanic: 946; 55.48%

Age 
 19 or less: 409; 23.99%
 20-24: 405: 23.75%
 25-29: 233: 13.67%
 30-34: 175; 10.26%
 35-39: 108; 6.33%
 40-49: 203; 11.91%
 50 +: 171; 10.03%
 Unknown: 1; 0.44%

Student life

Student clubs
Some of the student clubs at FRC are:
 Art Club
 Debate Club
 Enactus
 Equine Club
 International Culture Club
 Math Club
 Phi Theta Kappa Honor Society
 STE^2AM Team (Science, Technology, Engineering, Entrepreneurship, Art and Mathematics Club)
 Student Environmental Association (SEA)

Athletics 
Feather River College offers eight women's sports and five men's sports. These sports include basketball, volleyball, football, soccer, softball, baseball, rodeo, cross country, track and field and sand volleyball. FRC has academic advising for athletes, as well as athletic trainers. Training facilities available to student athletes include an on-campus gymnasium, weight room, track, practice fields and an off-campus fitness center. The campus and surrounding area also feature hundreds of acres for outdoor training.  In 2020, the women's volleyball team won the first state sports championship in school history after a 35–2 season with a win over previously undefeated Irvine Valley College. Following this, setter Mere Nagase became the first AVCA All-American Award winner in school history.

References

External links 
 Official website

 
Buildings and structures in Plumas County, California
California Community Colleges
Educational institutions established in 1968
Schools accredited by the Western Association of Schools and Colleges
Universities and colleges in Plumas County, California